Preston is a station on the METRORail Red Line in Houston, Texas (USA). The station is located at Main Street and Preston Street in Downtown Houston. This was the 2nd station heading south along the rail line, but the rail has expanded further north as of spring, 2014. This station is located in the Northern, Historic part of Downtown Houston.

Points of interest
Attractions located within a short walk of the station include:

Listed below are in the Houston Theater District
 The Downtown Aquarium
 Bayou Place
 Alley Theatre
 The Wortham Theater
 Minute Maid Park
 Jones Hall 

The following court buildings are within walking distance:
 Harris County Civil Courts
 Harris County Family Courts
 Harris County Juvenile Courts
 Harris County Criminal Courts

Hotels
 Hotel Icon
 The Magnolia Hotel
 Hotel Alden
 The Lancaster

Restaurants
 Mia Bella

Bars
 Little Dipper
 Captain Foxheart's Bad News Bar
 Pastry War
 Notsouh 
 Dean's
 Okra Charity Bar
 Clutch City Squire
 Moving Sidewalk

Bus connections
The following bus route numbers connect to Preston Station

 1 Hospital, 3 Langley/West Gray, 5 Kashmere Gardens/Southmore, 6 Jensen/Tanglewood, 9 North Main/Gulfton, 11 Almeda/Nance, 15 Fulton, 20 Canal/Long Point Limited, 24 Northline, 30 Clinton/Cullen, 44 Acres Homes Limited, 52 Hirsch/Scott, 53 Briar Forest, 56 Airline Limited, 60 South MacGregor, 66 Yale, 77 Liberty/MLK, 78 Alabama/Irvington, 79 West Little York Limited, 80 Dowling/Lyons, 82 Westheimer, 85 Antoine.

 102 Bush IAH Limited, 108 Veterans Memorial Limited, 137 Northshore Limited, 163 Fondren Limited.

 202 Kuykendahl, 204 Spring, 209 North Corridor Combined, 212 Seton Lake, 221 Kingsland, 244 Monroe, 246 Bay Area, 247 Fuqua, 249 Gulf Corridor Combined, 255 Kingwood, 256 Eastex, 257 Townsen, 259 Eastex Corridor Combined, 262 Westwood, 265 West Bellfort, 269 Southwest Corridor Combined.

References

METRORail stations
Railway stations in the United States opened in 2004
2004 establishments in Texas
Railway stations in Harris County, Texas